Jacques Servin (also known by the pseudonym Andy Bichlbaum; born 1963) is an American media artist and activist. He is one of the leading members of The Yes Men, a culture jamming activist group. Their exploits in "identity correction" are documented in the films The Yes Men (2003), The Yes Men Fix the World (2009), and The Yes Men Are Revolting (2014). As Ray Thomas, he is a co-founder of RTMark.

A former Maxis employee, he was fired in 1996 after secretly adding code into the game SimCopter that would cause sprites of men in swimming trunks kissing each other to appear on certain dates. He said he did this due to the intolerable working conditions suffered at Maxis. This was not discovered until after the game had been published. The resulting media storm, which Servin said he did not expect, inspired him to start RTMark, a bulletin board for similar actions, but whose goal was to get attention for under-reported issues.

Servin is also the author of two books of short stories, published with FC2. Originally from Tucson, Arizona, Servin is a professor at Parsons the New School for Design. He is openly gay.

References

External links
 Presenter at Cusp Conference 2010

Living people
Anti-consumerists
Anti-globalization activists
The Yes Men
American performance artists
Maxis
Writers from Tucson, Arizona
Artists from Tucson, Arizona
LGBT people from Arizona
American gay writers
American gay artists
Parsons School of Design faculty
American short story writers
American male short story writers
1963 births
Gay academics